City West is an area in the centre of Berlin, Germany. 

City West, CityWest or Citywest may also refer to:

 CityWest, a cable company and ISP in British Columbia, Canada
 City West, a campus of the University of South Australia, Adelaide
 Citywest, Dublin, Ireland, a business park and suburb 
 Citywest Campus Luas stop, tram stop in the Dublin suburb 
 CityWest Homes, Westminster, London, a housing association
 City West Housing Trust, Salford, Greater Manchester, England, a housing association
 City West, Indiana, US, an abandoned village 
 City West railway station, Perth, Australia 
 St. John's City West (Antigua), a parliamentary constituency

See also 
 West End (disambiguation)